Dagonodum is an extinct genus of ziphiid cetacean known from Tortonian age marine deposits in the Gram Formation in Denmark. There is only one known species, Dagonodum mojnum.

Etymology

The genus name is a reference to the god Dagon, worshiped as the head god and as a deity of prosperity in ancient inland Syria, but best known from H.P. Lovecraft's short story, where he is instead depicted as deep-sea deity. The species name is a reference to the word for "goodbye" in the local South Jutlandic dialect where the fossils were found. The word, "mojn", is of German origin, where it is used as both a greeting and a farewell.

Taxonomy

The species is distinguished by its two pairs of mandibular tusks and long snout. It also possessed a long neck, leading to speculation that it wasn't well suited to deep-dives.

Feeding

The species is notable for its difference from other ziphiidae of the period in that it seems to be less reliant on suction feeding.

References

Animals described in 2016
Ziphiids
Prehistoric cetacean genera
Miocene cetaceans
Fossils of Denmark
Monotypic mammal genera
Dagon